Mount Guan is a mountain in the Central Mountain Range of Taiwan with an elevation of .

See also
List of mountains in Taiwan

References

Mountains of Taiwan
Landforms of Kaohsiung 
Landforms of Taitung County